The Ried Glacier is a 6 km long glacier (2005) situated in the Pennine Alps in the canton of Valais in Switzerland. In 1973 it had an area of 8.22 km2.

The glacier lies in the Mischabel range, at the foot of Nadelhorn and not far from Dom.

See also
List of glaciers in Switzerland
Swiss Alps

References

External links
Swiss glacier monitoring network

Glaciers of the Alps
Glaciers of Valais